Pyrgulopsis milleri is a species of very small freshwater snail with an operculum, an aquatic gastropod mollusk in the family Hydrobiidae.

Distribution 
Pyrgulopsis milleri occurs only in water from springs in the upper part of the Tule River in southwestern California.

References

milleri
Gastropods described in 2010